The Simpsons: Testify is an album that features songs from the animated television series The Simpsons. It was released on September 18, 2007. It includes appearances by artists such as Jackson Browne, Shawn Colvin, David Byrne, The B-52's, The Baha Men, NRBQ and "Weird Al" Yankovic, and an alternate version of the end credits performed by Los Lobos. Ricky Gervais, Steve Buscemi and Kelsey Grammer are also featured in various songs.

It includes four previously unaired bonus tracks: "Hullaba Lula" (featuring Kelsey Grammer as Sideshow Bob), "Song of the Wild Beasts", "Dancing Workers' Song" and "Oldies and Nudies".

Track listing
The album features the following tracks:

Reception

Dalton Ross of Entertainment Weekly praised the CD, calling it his obsession of the week and saying "The Simpsons ... is still capable of short bursts of genius. And many of them are collected on the show's latest musical collection, The Simpsons Testify. Listening to the CD reminds you what made you fall in love with the show in the first place: the random cameos (David Byrne to Weird Al Yankovic), pop-culture parodies (Stretch Dude and Clobber Girl), and knowing, self-deprecating humor (They'll Never Stop the Simpsons). My personal favorite is Ode to Branson, which pays tribute to all the washed-up celebrities of yesteryear. ... So even if the show is no longer appointment viewing in your house, this CD definitely warrants another trip to Springfield."

References

External links
Alf Clausen - The Simpsons Testify CD Interview

The Simpsons soundtrack albums
2007 soundtrack albums
Television animation soundtracks
Shout! Factory compilation albums
Shout! Factory soundtracks
Albums with cover art by Matt Groening